Cherie Johnson (born November 21, 1975) is an American actress, writer, film producer, and author. She is known for her roles on Punky Brewster as Punky's best friend Cherie and Family Matters, where she played Laura Winslow's best friend Maxine Johnson for eight seasons (1990–1998).

In 2009, she wrote, starred in, and produced the independent film I Do... I Did!, playing Vivian. Johnson has so far produced eight films. In 2010, she made writer debut when she released her book Around The World Twice. In 2011, she released her second, writing, Two Different Walks Of Life A Celebrity and Average Housewife. Her third novel Peaches and Cream is available. Her book Stupid Guys Diary was released in August 2013.

Background and career

Born in Pittsburgh, Pennsylvania, Johnson is of mixed African-American and Puerto Rican heritage. Johnson's beginnings in show business are attributed to her uncle, David W. Duclon, a successful screenwriter and TV producer, who was known for his work on Happy Days in the 1970s. Duclon encouraged his niece's desire to act, and secured her an audition. In 1984, after two seasons as executive producer of NBC's Silver Spoons, Duclon successfully pitched a new pilot to the network about an orphaned young girl who is taken in by a curmudgeonly older man. The concept won the approval of NBC programming chief Brandon Tartikoff, who named the titular character, and series, Punky Brewster (after a girl he had known in his youth). Johnson was cast by NBC in the role of Punky's (Soleil Moon Frye) best friend, the character  modeled and named after herself. Punky Brewster was an immediate success among young audiences, and Johnson continued as the fictional Cherie throughout the series' run (1984–86 on NBC, and 1987–88 in first-run syndication).
 
In 1990, Johnson began playing Maxine "Max" Johnson, the best friend of Laura Winslow (Kellie Shanygne Williams) on Family Matters, appearing in the recurring role until the series' end in 1998. Duclon was again her employer, as he served as one of the executive producers of Family Matters during Johnson's run on the show. In addition to her starring roles, Johnson has made guest appearances on The Parkers, and voiced a guest role on the Disney Channel animated series The Proud Family. She has also appeared on Days of Our Lives. In the early 2000s, Johnson began producing films. In 2009, she wrote, starred in, and produced the film I Do... I Did!. In 2010, she starred in many films Lights Out, Nobody Smiling and Guardian of Eden. She then signed on to appear in the romantic film Fanaddict, which was shot in 2011 and is slated for release later in 2013.

In 2020, NBC confirmed a 10-episode revival of Punky Brewster on its Peacock streaming service. Soleil Moon Frye and Johnson will reprise their roles.

Writer
Her first novel, Around The World Twice, was released August 10, 2010. On April 14, 2011, Johnson also released a poetry book with her I Do...I Did! co-writer, entitled Two Different Walks of Life. Her second novel was Peaches and Cream, and her book of diary entries Stupid Guys Diary was released August 2014 . Little Cherie Dresses Herself, a children's book, was released 2016.  Writing has become Johnson's second career choice; she is also the assistant editor of Fever magazine and was formerly the executive director for Dimez magazine, and was contributing writer for Temptation magazine and Glam Couture magazine, where she did a monthly article titled "Cherie Picking". In 2016, she accepted a position at Fever magazine and will be writing the "Pulse" article.

Editor and co-host
Johnson is the assistant editor at Fever. In 2019, she started Cherie's World Podcast. Her notable guests include   her cousin Shar Jackson, Raz-B, Dawn Robinson, Chris Haynes, Soleil Moon Frye, DL Hughley, from Family Matters: Darius McCrary, Jaimee Foxworth, Kellie S Williams, and Shawn  Harrison.

In February 2020, the Cherie’s World Podcast interview with Big Daddy Kane went viral when Cherie’s co-host asked Big Daddy Kane, "Who is the Kobe Bryant of hip-hop?"  Kane’s response was Eminem.

Personal life
Johnson joined Shadow Play Entertainment's literacy campaign, called "Take Time to Read", as the national spokesperson, sharing her thoughts on why reading is so important no matter what career people choose. She has said that her favorite artists are Prince and Dr. Dre. Johnson has also explained that she is a big sports fanatic; her favorite team is the Pittsburgh Steelers, and she is a fan of former NBA player Paul Pierce. During an interview, Johnson described herself as somewhat of a nerd and a homebody and that she loves to read, write, paint, eat and travel. She also explained she doesn't watch any TV or many movies, but she loves music and her family. She has also stated she is somewhat of a "Twitter-holic" and is often tweeting.

Johnson spends her free time working with many children's charities, and she is also on the Alzheimer's Association board.

Filmography

Film

Television

Writings
 2010: Around the World Twice
 2011: Two Different Walks of Life: "A Celebrity and Average Housewife"
 2012: August 7 novel Peaches & Cream
 2013: "Stupid Guys Diary"
 2018: "Lil Cherie Dresse's Herself"

Awards and nominations

References

External links

1975 births
20th-century American actresses
21st-century American actresses
Actresses from Pittsburgh
African-American actresses
American actresses of Puerto Rican descent
American child actresses
American film actresses
American television actresses
American voice actresses
Living people
20th-century African-American women
20th-century African-American people
21st-century African-American women
21st-century African-American people